The 2019 Dakar Rally was the 41st edition of the event and the eleventh successive year that the event was held in South America. The event started in Lima, Peru on 6 January and finished there on 17 January after 10 stages of competition.

Qatari Nasser Al-Attiyah won his third Dakar in the Cars division for Toyota, in the process becoming the second person to win the Dakar Rally with three different vehicle manufacturers (other wins came with Volkswagen in 2011 and Mini in 2015). In the Bikes division, Toby Price of Australia won his second Dakar Rally despite suffering from a fractured wrist during the event. The Kamaz team of Eduard Nikolaev, Evgenii Iakovlev and Vladimir Rybakov won their third consecutive title in the Trucks division.

This would mark the final time the Dakar Rally was held in South America. From 2020 onwards, the rally was held in Saudi Arabia.

Number of entries

Stages
Distance according to the official website.

Bikes, quads and cars

Trucks and UTVs

Stage results

Bikes

Quads

Cars

UTV's

Trucks

Final standings

Bikes

Cars

Quads

Trucks

UTVs

Entry lists

Bikes

Cars

Quads

Trucks

UTVs

References 

Dakar Rally
Dakar Rally
Dakar Rally
Dakar Rally
Dakar Rally
Sports competitions in Lima
Dakar Rally
Dakar Rally